Sergey Kazakov (born 9 November 1953) is a former international speedway rider from the Soviet Union.

Speedway career 
Kazakov is a two times world champion the gold medal at the Individual Ice Speedway World Championship in the 1982 Individual Ice Speedway World Championship and 1983 Individual Ice Speedway World Championship.

In addition he won the Team Ice Racing World Championship four times (1982, 1984, 1988 and 1990).

World final appearances

Ice World Championship
1975  Moscow, 3rd – 25pts
1982  Inzell, champion – 28pts 
1983  Eindhoven, champion – 28pts
1985  Assen, 15th
1988  Eindhoven, 4th

References 

1953 births
Living people
Russian speedway riders
Sportspeople from Vladivostok